Maculauger castigatus is a species of sea snail, a marine gastropod mollusk in the family Terebridae, the auger snails.

Description
The length of the shell varies between  10 mm and 20 mm

Distribution
This marine species occurs in the Gulf of Suez.

References

 Terryn Y. & Rosado J. (2016). Two new species of Hastulopsis (Gastropoda: Terebridae) from Oman and Somalia. Gloria Maris. 55(1): 3-8

External links
 Cooke A.H. (1885). Report on the testaceous Mollusca obtained during a dredging excursion in the Gulf of Suez in the months February and March 1869 by Robert MacAndrew. Republished, with additions and corrections. Part I. Annals and Magazine of Natural History. ser. 5, 15: 322-339
 Fedosov, A. E.; Malcolm, G.; Terryn, Y.; Gorson, J.; Modica, M. V.; Holford, M.; Puillandre, N. (2020). Phylogenetic classification of the family Terebridae (Neogastropoda: Conoidea). Journal of Molluscan Studies

Terebridae
Gastropods described in 1885